Higher state of consciousness may refer to:

Higher consciousness
Higher State of Consciousness (song), a song by American electronic artist Josh Wink